Lumber is an unincorporated community in Columbia County, Arkansas, in the United States.

References

Unincorporated communities in Columbia County, Arkansas
Unincorporated communities in Arkansas